HMS Martin was an M-class destroyer of the Royal Navy, launched at the Tyneside yard of Vickers-Armstrongs on 12 December 1940. She had a busy but brief wartime career, being sunk by the German submarine  on 10 November 1942 off Algiers.

Service history

Convoy PQ 17
Martin was an escort for the Home Fleet during the ill-fated Convoy PQ 17, sailing from Scapa on 30 June and cruising off Bear Island, arriving back at Scapa Flow on 11 July. They arrived at Kola Inlet on 24 July and Archangel some days later. Martin  sailed from Archangel on 14 August and joined the US cruiser .

Convoy PQ18

Martin sailed from Scapa Flow on 4 September to join the escorts of convoy PQ 18. PQ 18 was heavily attacked by aircraft and lost ten ships, which were sunk, by torpedo bomber attacks and two others by U-boat, out of an original convoy of 40 ships. On 16 September, Martin with Scylla and the rest of the destroyers transferred to the westbound convoy, QP 14. This convoy escaped air attack, but lost three ships out of fifteen to U-boats, which in addition sank two of the escort and a fleet oiler. Martin arrived back at Scapa Flow on 27 September with survivors from four merchant ships.

Loss
Martin was allocated to the escort group for Force "H" in Operation “Torch”, the landings in North Africa.  She sailed from Scapa Flow on 30 October as part of the escort for Force "H", and after fuelling at Gibraltar on 5 November re-joined Force "H"- the covering force to the landings at Algiers and Oran, on 8 November.  The task of Force "H" was to guard against action by the Italian fleet, during the landings. Martin  was torpedoed by  under command of Wilhelm Dommes on the morning of 10 November as a result of which she blew up and sank in position .  The only survivors were five officers and 59 ratings picked up by the destroyer .

Notes

References

External links
 
HMS Martin website
IWM Interview with survivor George Nye

 

L and M-class destroyers of the Royal Navy
1940 ships
Ships built on the River Tyne
Maritime incidents in November 1942
Ships sunk by German submarines in World War II
World War II shipwrecks in the Mediterranean Sea
Ships built by Vickers Armstrong